The Ontario and Livingston Mutual Insurance Office was built in 1841.  It is significant as one of only about 20 commercial structures known to have been built with cobblestone architecture.

References

External links

Office buildings on the National Register of Historic Places in New York (state)
Office buildings completed in 1841
Buildings and structures in Ontario County, New York
National Register of Historic Places in Ontario County, New York